Conospermum triplinervium, commonly known as the tree smokebush or elk smokebush, is a tree or shrub endemic to Western Australia.

It blooms between August and January producing cream-white flowers. It has an upright habit and produces about 50 flowering stems per plant which produce white hairy flowers mostly during summer between August and November. It has a number of forms with broad leaves and several habits from weeping to strong upright stems.

The species was first formally described  by the botanist Robert Brown in 1830 as part of the work Proteaceas Novas. Supplementum primum prodromi florae Novae Hollandiae. There are two synonyms; Conospermum laniflorum and Conospermum triplinervium var. triplinervium.

It is found on sand plains and in winter wet depressions along the coast in the Mid West, Wheatbelt, Peel and Great Southern regions of Western Australia where it grows in sandy soils over laterite. 

The plant is suitable for the production of cut flowers with a reasonably high yield. It is also suitable as animal fodder, the 1889 book 'The Useful Native Plants of Australia’ records that common names included "Native Orange" and "Orange Thorn" and that "Baron Mueller suggests that these plants be tried on the worst desert country, as all kinds of pasture animals browse with avidity on the long, tender, and downy flower-stalks and spikes, without touching the foliage, thus not destroying the plant by close cropping."

References

External links

triplinervium
Endemic flora of Western Australia
Eudicots of Western Australia
Plants described in 1830
Taxa named by Robert Brown (botanist, born 1773)